Mariann Jelinek  is an American organizational theorist, and Emeritus Professor of Strategy at the College of William & Mary, considered an icon for her contributions in the field of management of technology and innovation.

Biography 
Born in 1942, in 1960 Jelinek started to study English, French, Modern European history at the University of California, Berkeley, where she received her A.B. in 1967, her M.A. in English literature in 1968 and her Ph.D. in English literature in 1973. In 1977 she obtained his D.B.A. in administrative systems from Harvard Business School with the thesis, entitled "Institutionalizing innovation."

Jelinek started her academic career with appointments at the Tuck School of Business, the McGill University, and the University at Albany, SUNY. In 1984 she was appointed professor at the Case Western Reserve University, and in 1989 moved to the College of William & Mary, where she was Professor of Strategy for 22 years. Since 2001 she is fellow at the Center for Innovation Management Studies (CIMS) at the North Carolina State University, becoming academic fellow in 2002. In the years 2007–2010 she was also visiting research scholar at the Eindhoven University of Technology in The Netherlands, and was visiting research scholar at the University of Melbourne in Australia.

Mariann Jelinek was married to the American organizational theorist Joseph A. Litterer (1926–1995).

Jelinek's research interests are in the fields of management of technology and innovation, and organizational change, specifically the leveraging information for strategic advantage.

Selected publications 
 Lau, James B., and Mariann Jelinek. Behavior in organizations. Irwin, 1979.
 Jelinek, Mariann. Institutionalizing innovation: A study of organizational learning systems. New York: Praeger, 1979.
 Jelinek, Mariann, Joseph August Litterer, and Raymond E. Miles. Organizations by design: Theory and practice. Business Publications, 1981.
 Jelinek, Mariann, and Claudia Bird Schoonhoven. The innovation marathon: Lessons from high technology firms. San Francisco: Jossey-Bass, 1993.

Articles, a selection: 
 Jelinek M. (1980) "Toward Systematic Management: Alexander Hamilton Church," Business History Review 54: p. 63-79.
 Goldhar, Joel D., and Mariann Jelinek. "Plan for economies of scope." Harvard Business Review 61.6 (1983): 141–148.
 Adler, Nancy J., and Mariann Jelinek. "Is "organization culture" culture bound?." Human Resource Management 25.1 (1986): 73–90.

References

External links 
 Mariann Jelinek, Ph.D. The Richard C. Kraemer Professor of Strategy, Emerita

Living people
American business theorists
UC Berkeley College of Letters and Science alumni
Harvard Business School alumni
Tuck School of Business faculty
Academic staff of McGill University
University at Albany, SUNY faculty
Case Western Reserve University faculty
Mason School of Business faculty
Year of birth missing (living people)